Jim Inglis (20 March 1928 – 20 November 2015) was a Scotland international rugby union footballer, who played as a Prop.

Rugby union career

Amateur career

Inglis played for Selkirk.

Inglis won the unofficial Scottish championship with Selkirk in the 1952-53 season as well as winning the Border League.

During his time with the KOSB he played for their rugby side.

Provincial career

Inglis represented South. He played in the Scottish Inter-District Championship in its first season; 1953-54.

Inglis was also selected for the Co-Optimists and the Scottish Borderers.

International career

Inglis was capped for  once, in 1952, in the Five Nations Calcutta Cup match against .

Administration

Inglis became President of Selkirk rugby club and the Border League.

Inglis received the Spirit of Rugby award in 2015, shortly before his death.

Outside of rugby

Inglis served in the King's Own Scottish Borderers.

For a short period he became a goalkeeper for Selkirk F.C.

References

1928 births
2015 deaths
Scottish rugby union players
Scotland international rugby union players
Rugby union players from Selkirk, Scottish Borders
Selkirk RFC players
South of Scotland District (rugby union) players
Selkirk F.C. players
Association football goalkeepers
Scottish footballers
Rugby union props